The John Virginius and Annice Bennes House is a house located in the Arlington Heights section of Portland, Oregon designed by prominent architect John Virginius Bennes for he and his wife, Annice. The house is registered on the National Register for Historic Places.

The house was designed in the style of Mediterranean Revival and Prairie School architecture, the latter of which Bennes has been credited with for introducing to Oregon.

See also
 National Register of Historic Places listings in Southwest Portland, Oregon

References

1911 establishments in Oregon
Houses on the National Register of Historic Places in Portland, Oregon
Mediterranean Revival architecture in the United States
Prairie School architecture in Oregon